The Delta Upsilon Chapter House is a historic building located in Ames, Iowa, United States. It is considered one of the more imposing architectural examples among fraternity chapter houses at Iowa State University. It was designed by Des Moines architect Alexander M. Linn, who joined Delta Upsilon at what was then called Iowa State College. The fraternity's chapter house was on Hyland Avenue at that time. Linn, howevever, did not graduate from Iowa State as he transferred to the University of Illinois where he graduated with a degree in architectural engineering in 1923. Completed in 1930, the 2½-story, French Renaissance-style building features brick and half-timbering wall surfaces, and a complex roof system that includes steep pitches and polychrome slate. It was listed on the National Register of Historic Places in 2010.

References

Houses completed in 1930
Fraternity and sorority houses
Delta Upsilon
Renaissance Revival architecture in Iowa
Buildings and structures in Ames, Iowa
National Register of Historic Places in Story County, Iowa
Residential buildings on the National Register of Historic Places in Iowa